Martin Verner (born March 5, 1980) is a Czech swimmer. At the 2008 Summer Olympics, he competed in the men's 100 metre freestyle, finishing in 21st place and failing to reach the semi-finals.  At the 2012 Summer Olympics, he competed in the Men's 100 metre freestyle, finishing in 23rd place overall in the heats, failing to qualify for the semifinals.

References

Czech male freestyle swimmers
1980 births
Living people
Olympic swimmers of the Czech Republic
Swimmers at the 2008 Summer Olympics
Swimmers at the 2012 Summer Olympics